William Asa "W.A." Vines was born on May 6, 1853, in Troy, Alabama to Chesley Daniel Vines and Elizabeth Matheny. He was orphaned as a boy and worked for two years in order to earn his passages to Texas by wagon train. Late, he hired himself out as a farmhand for more than 13 years before saving enough money to buy his own land. Vines married Martha Caroline Welch and had five children.

Vines and his family eventually moved to Plano. Later, Vines went on to be the director of Plano National Bank. His wife, Martha, died in 1911. Vines died in 1929  at the age of 76.

Vines High School, founded in 1976, in Plano, Texas rests on the former farmland of William Vines. His home was just west of the Vines High School.

Sources

1853 births
1929 deaths
Vines, W. A.